Douglas Frank Clark (27 April 1927 – 4 May 2008) was an Australian politician.

He was born in Hobart. In 1964 he was elected to the Tasmanian House of Assembly as a Liberal member for Franklin. He served as a minister from 1969 to 1972. He was defeated in 1976. He died in Canberra.

References

1927 births
2008 deaths
Liberal Party of Australia members of the Parliament of Tasmania
Members of the Tasmanian House of Assembly
20th-century Australian politicians